Anatrachyntis japonica is a moth in the family Cosmopterigidae. It was described by Kuroko in 1982, and is known from Japan.

References

Moths described in 1982
Anatrachyntis
Moths of Japan